Deborah Kerr (born 17 November 1997) is a British canoeist. She competed in the women's K-1 200 metres and the K-1 500 metres  events at the 2020 Summer Olympics.

References

External links
 

1997 births
Living people
British female canoeists
Canoeists at the 2020 Summer Olympics
Olympic canoeists of Great Britain
People from Carluke